Adamwahan Bridge railway station is a railway station located in Gharibabad, Bahawalpur District, Pakistan.

See also
 List of railway stations in Pakistan
 Pakistan Railways

References

Railway stations in Pakistan